Rhianna is a feminine name and a variation of the Welsh name Rhiannon. Notable people with the name include:

 Rhianna (singer) (born 1982), British singer
 Rhianna Atwood, contestant on America's Next Top Model in 2010
 Rhianna Patrick (born 1977), Australian radio presenter
 Rhianna Pratchett (born 1976), English video game scriptwriter

See also 
 Rhiana Griffith (born 1985), Australian actress and model
 Rhiana Gunn-Wright (born 1988), American political scientist
Rhiannon (given name)
Riana § People with the given name Riana
Rihanna (born 1988), Barbadian singer